The Bega Luncanilor (also: Bega Mare) is the left headwater of the river Bega in Romania. It is also considered the upper course of the Bega. At its confluence with the Bega Poienilor in Curtea, the Bega is formed.

Tributaries 

The following rivers are tributaries to the river Bega Luncanilor (in downstream order):

Left: Valea Tăieturii, Pârâul Mare

Right: Stâlpu, Valea lui Liman, Druia, Cornetu

References

Rivers of Romania
Rivers of Timiș County